Pseudoclavibacter caeni is a Gram-positive, strictly aerobic, rod-shaped and non-motile bacterium from the genus Pseudoclavibacter which has been isolated from sludge from a sewage plant from Daejeon in Korea.

References

Microbacteriaceae
Bacteria described in 2012